Empress Quan (244 – early 300s), also known as Quan Huijie, was an empress of the state of Eastern Wu during the Three Kingdoms period of China. She was married to Sun Liang, the second emperor of Wu.

Life
Lady Quan was a daughter of Quan Shang (全尚). Her mother was a daughter of Sun Gong, the grandson of Sun Jing. Her relative Quan Cong married Sun Luban, a daughter of Wu's founding emperor Sun Quan. When she was young, she looked pretty and was favoured by Sun Luban. Every time Sun Luban entered the palace, she took Lady Quan to visit her father. When a succession struggle between Sun Quan's sons Sun He and Sun Ba was ongoing, Sun Luban, who had a feud with Sun He's mother, urged her father to arrange a marriage between Lady Quan and Sun Liang (another of Sun Quan's sons born to Lady Pan) because Sun Liang and his mother were becoming increasingly favoured by Sun Quan. Around 250, the succession struggle between Sun He and Sun Ba concluded when Sun Quan deposed Sun He from his position as crown prince and forced Sun Ba to commit suicide. Sun Liang was designated as the new heir apparent to the Wu throne.

In May 252, Sun Liang ascended the throne upon the death of his father. On 16 February 253, he instated Lady Quan as the empress. Following that, Empress Quan's family and relatives rose to power as six members of the Quan clan (including Quan Shang) were enfeoffed as marquises and assumed high offices in the Wu government and military forces. This was regarded as a phenomenon because since the founding of Wu in 229, there had never been a case of waiqi (外戚; relatives of the emperor's wives) playing prominent roles in the Wu political scene. In 257, when Zhuge Dan (a general from Wu's rival state Cao Wei) started a rebellion in the Wei-controlled Shouchun (壽春; around present-day Shou County, Anhui), he requested help from Wu so Sun Liang ordered the Quans to lead troops to Shouchun to assist Zhuge Dan. However, the rebellion was suppressed by Wei forces and Zhuge Dan was killed, while four of the Quans surrendered and defected to Wei, thereafter the Quans' influence in Wu weakened drastically.

In November 258, Sun Liang was deposed from the throne by Sun Chen, a distant relative of the Wu imperial family who rose to power in the 250s and became the regent of Wu. Sun Liang became known as the "Prince of Kuaiji" after his dethronement while Empress Quan also lost her place as the empress. In 260, Sun Liang's elder half-brother and successor, Sun Xiu (who eliminated Sun Chen after ascending the throne in 258) further demoted Sun Liang to "Marquis of Houguan" and sent Sun Liang to his marquisate in Houguan County (侯官縣; around present-day Fuzhou, Fujian). Lady Quan accompanied Sun Liang to Houguan County and settled there. She returned to the Wu capital Jianye (建業; present-day Nanjing, Jiangsu) after Wu was vanquished in 280 by forces of the Jin dynasty. She died sometime in the Yongning era (301–303) of the reign of Emperor Hui of Jin.

See also
 Eastern Wu family trees#Sun Liang
 Lists of people of the Three Kingdoms

Notes

References

 Chen, Shou (3rd century). Records of the Three Kingdoms (Sanguozhi).
 Pei, Songzhi (5th century). Annotations to Records of the Three Kingdoms (Sanguozhi zhu).
 Xue, Fucheng ( 19th century). Yonghe Biji (庸盒筆記).

244 births
300s deaths
Eastern Wu empresses
People from Hangzhou